Rima Beradze (born 28 October 1955) is a Georgian politician. Since 2020, she has been a member of the Parliament of Georgia of the 10th convocation by party list, election bloc for Georgian Dream – Democratic Georgia.

Beradze became briefly infamous in December 2015 for stating, that it "was absolutely possible that a socially vulnerable person could survive on food worth 1.18 GEL [per day, approximately 0.70 USD] at the capital city’s budget financed free of charge canteens".

References

People from Georgia (country)
1955 births
Living people